Activity-based working (ABW) recognises that people perform different activities in their day-to-day work, and therefore need a variety of work settings supported by the right technology and culture to carry out these activities effectively. Activity Based Working’s heavy emphasis on the creation of a culture of connection, inspiration, accountability and trust empowers individuals, teams and the organisation to perform to their potential. On a personal level Activity Based Working also enables each person to organise their work activities in a productive and enjoyable way that best suits what they need to do, and who they need to do it with. Although not normally driven by cost-saving as the business strategy, it can produce efficiencies and cost savings through the nature of collaboration and team work helping to work more effectively. Inspiring spaces that evolve from an activity-based approach are designed to create opportunities for a variety of workplace activities, from intense and focused work to collaborative settings, areas for impromptu meetings or more formal meetings.

Studies suggest that ABW (counter-intuitively) reduces face-to-face interactions, and increases email traffic significantly. Yet when we drill down further into these articles we discover that these misunderstandings come from mistaking Activity Based Working for simply a choice of one office layout over the other. Activity Based Working, rather, is a way of working that encourages teams to connect, individuals to flourish and organisations to thrive.

History

The first known reference to an activity-based analysis of office work modes was by American architect Robert Luchetti from the late 1970s. He co-invented the now widely accepted concept of the office as a series of "activity settings" in 1983. In an activity settings-based environment, multiple settings are provided which have different technical and physical attributes assembled to support the variety of performance "modes" that take place in a work environment.

The term "Activity Based Working" was first coined in the book the Art of Working by Erik Veldhoen, a Dutch consultant with Veldhoen + Company, and author of the book The Demise of the Office.  Activity Based Working was first implemented by Interpolis by Veldhoen + Company in the nineties in the Netherlands. Interpolis is one of largest insurance companies in the Netherlands. The company gained wide recognition with its advertising campaign "Interpolis.Crystal clear", which was adopted from their vision that was brought to life from their new way of working. Besides financial compensation, Interpolis also offers compensation in kind.

The activity-based office

The activity‐based office concept of the modern office is said to increase productivity through the stimulation of interaction and communication while retaining employee satisfaction and reducing the accommodation costs. Although some research has gone into understanding the added value, there is still a need for sound data on the relationship between office design, its intentions and the actual use after implementation.

The concept of activity-based workplace has been implemented in organisations as a solution to improve office space efficiency. However, the question of whether or not office workers' comfort or productivity are compromised in the pursuit of space efficiency has not been fully investigated. There are obstacles and issues of concern when practicing the activity-based office concept. A study carried out in activity-based workplace settings reports that employees without an assigned desk complain of desk shortages, difficulty finding colleagues which limits immediate collaboration, wasted time finding and setting up a workstation, and limited ability to adjust or personalise workstations to meet individual ergonomic needs. Another study suggest the importance of office design on occupants' satisfaction, perceived productivity and health long with reduced time workers spent seated in ABW offices

The most recent study released in 2020 by Veldhoen + Company, the founders of Activity Based Working, was the biggest global research project on Activity Based Working. The research set out searching for the measurable impact that Activity Based Working has, and drivers of success in Activity Based Working transitions. The research project was started in July 2019 and since then, COVID-19 had impacted every aspect of our lives, especially how we work. With a reach involving 32,369 responses and spanning 11 countries, the questions that were explored in addition to questions used from Leesman surveys, provided valuable context to understanding office workers’ behaviour. In particular the question we all face now in 2021 with what it might mean to go back to the office. The data tells us not only what type of workplace to return to, but also how to do so.

Need for a new office

To create a successful work environment, it is important to have insight into the demands and behaviours of the employees using this environment. Recently there has also been a move towards understanding interior design features underpinning occupants' higher satisfaction results in ABW, open-plan offices

There are three pillars that support a new way of working, based on the philosophy of activity-based working. These are the behavioral, virtual and physical environment of work environment, which can be linked to the working processes of human resources, IT and facility management in the work environment.

References

Office buildings
Real estate